The men's 500 metres races of the 2014–15 ISU Speed Skating World Cup 2, arranged in the Taereung International Ice Rink, in Seoul, South Korea, were held on the weekend of 21–23 November 2014.

Race one was won by Pavel Kulizhnikov of Russia, while Mo Tae-bum of South Korea came second, and Ruslan Murashov of Russia came third. Dai Dai Ntab of the Netherlands won Division B of race one, and was thus, under the rules, automatically promoted to Division A for race two.

In race two, the top two were the same as in race one, Kulizhnikov and Mo, while Laurent Dubreuil of Canada took the bronze. Pim Schipper of the Netherlands won Division B of race two.

Race 1
Race one took place on Friday, 21 November, with Division B scheduled in the morning session, at 12:09, and Division A scheduled in the afternoon session, at 16:35.

Division A

Division B

Race 2
Race two took place on Sunday, 23 November, with Division B scheduled in the morning session, at 10:58, and Division A scheduled in the afternoon session, at 13:45.

Division A

Division B

References

Men 00500
2